Arris District is a district of Batna Province, Algeria.

Municipalities
Arris
Tighanimine

Districts of Batna Province